Oviedo Mall (previously known as the Oviedo Marketplace) is a single-story indoor shopping mall, with movie theater, located in Oviedo, Florida, a northeastern suburb of Orlando, Florida. The mall is owned  and managed by International Growth Properties. Its only current anchor store is Dillard's, although there are two empty spaces that formerly housed Macy’s and Sears. Other major tenants are Barnes & Noble, a Paul Mitchell cosmetology school, and a Regal Cinemas movie theater.

Until 2022, the Oviedo Mall used to features large portraits of historic areas of Oviedo, FL along with pictures of early European and African-American settlers in the area.  They have since been replaced by colorful murals and selfie stations by local artists, all of which feature a hidden rooster. The rooster is the mascot of Oviedo.

History
The first terrain in this site, Target, opened in October 1994. The Rouse Company built the Oviedo Marketplace, which opened for business on March 4, 1998. Initial tenants at opening included Gayfers and Dillard's department stores, plus a 22-screen theater owned by Regal Cinemas Oviedo Mall 22. At opening, the mall was 80-percent leased. Other major tenants at the mall included Barnes & Noble, a Foot Locker superstore, f.y.e., and Bed Bath & Beyond. In September 1998, after only seven months in operation, the Gayfers store was sold to Parisian. This was done because Dillard's had acquired Gayfers parent company, Mercantile Stores Company, Inc., and had agreed to sell certain Gayfers stores in malls already anchored by Dillard's to Parisian's then-parent company, Proffitt's.

Sears joined the mall as a third anchor in November 2000. Parisian closed the Oviedo Marketplace location in 2000 due to poor sales, and sold it to Burdines, which opened that November. The store rebranded to Burdines-Macy's in 2003, then just Macy's in 2005. Macy's closed in 2017. The space is now vacant. 

The mall struggled with low occupancy for most of its history, due to many factors such as poor location, a smaller footprint than other malls, competition from nearby Waterford Lakes Town Center, and exterior accesses for certain larger stores such as f.y.e. and Foot Locker, which discourage foot traffic within the mall proper. General Growth Properties bought the Rouse Company in 2004 and assumed ownership of the mall as a result. Bed Bath & Beyond, f.y.e. & Foot Locker moved outside the mall in 2009, due to the original location being too large. 

In 2010, General Growth sold the mall to CW Capital, who renamed it Oviedo Mall a year later. John Paul Mitchell Systems opened a beauty school at the mall in 2012, taking a space originally intended for a restaurant. CW Capital sold the center to 3D Investments in 2013. In 2014, the vacated Bed Bath & Beyond space became a gym called Zoo Health Club and a children's fitness facility called O2B Kids.

On August 31, 2019, it was announced that Sears would be closing this location a part of a plan to close 92 stores nationwide. The store closed in December 2019.

On January 7, 2020, the Oviedo City Council voted to redevelop portions of the mall into a 55+ community, as well as a hotel.   In August 2022, city leaders voted to get rid of the age restrictions and open the units to everyone. The plans still include a 124-room hotel and mixed-use retail spaces.  

Champs Sports and Dollar Tree closed in 2021. B Dalton opened in February 2022, reviving the B Dalton brand after 9 years.

References

External links
 Mall Website

Buildings and structures in Seminole County, Florida
Shopping malls in Florida
Tourist attractions in Seminole County, Florida
Shopping malls established in 1998
1998 establishments in Florida